Jayden Laverde (born 12 April 1996) is a professional Australian rules footballer with the Essendon Football Club in the Australian Football League (AFL). He was recruited with the 20th overall selection in the 2014 national draft.

Early life
Larvede started his career playing for the Keilor Football Club playing all his junior years there. as a young age he was touted for his athleticism and uniqueness.

Laverde played for the Western Jets in the TAC Cup and the Keilor Football Club. He was named All-Australian in the AFL Under 18 Championships, playing for Vic Metro. He made his AFL debut against  in round 15 of the 2015 AFL season.

AFL career
Larvede was drafted with pick 20 in the 2014 national draft. In 2016 he suffered an ankle injury and was sidelined for eight weeks.

Originally starting his career as a forward, in the 2021 AFL season his career was reinvigorated with a move to defence.

Statistics
Statistics are correct to the end of 2020 

|- style="background-color: #EAEAEA"
! scope="row" style="text-align:center" | 2015
|  || 33 || 9 || 5 || 1 || 49 || 68 || 117 || 32 || 34 || 0.6 || 0.1 || 5.4 || 7.6 || 13.0 || 3.6 || 3.8
|- 
! scope="row" style="text-align:center" | 2016
|  || 33 || 9 || 8|| 9 || 64 || 41 || 105 || 43 || 26 || 0.9 || 1.0 || 7.1 || 4.6 || 11.7 || 4.8 || 2.9
|- style="background-color: #EAEAEA"
! scope="row" style="text-align:center" | 2017
|  || 33 || 5 || 1 || 5 || 26 || 30 || 56 || 16 || 14 || 0.2 || 1.0 || 5.2 || 6.0 || 11.2 || 3.2 || 2.8
|- 
! scope="row" style="text-align:center" | 2018
|  || 33 || 7 || 5 || 6 || 54 || 37 || 91 || 27 || 18 || 0.7 || 0.9 || 7.7 || 5.3 || 13.0 || 3.9 || 2.6
|- style="background-color: #EAEAEA"
! scope="row" style="text-align:center" | 2019
|  || 15 || 10 || 11 || 13 || 66 || 48 || 114 || 39 || 21 || 1.1 || 1.3 || 6.6 || 4.8 || 11.4 || 3.9 || 2.1
|-
! scope="row" style="text-align:center" | 2020
|  || 15 || 6 || 6 || 3 || 30 || 16 || 46 || 20 || 15 || 0.3 || 0.5 || 5.0 || 2.7 || 7.7 || 3.3 || 2.5
|-
|- class="sortbottom"
! colspan=3| Career
! 46
! 36
! 37
! 289 
! 240 
! 529 
! 177
! 128 
! 0.8 
! 0.8
! 6.3
! 5.2 
! 11.5
! 3.9
! 2.8
|}

References

External links

1996 births
Living people
Essendon Football Club players
Australian rules footballers from Victoria (Australia)
Western Jets players
Australian people of French descent
People educated at Penleigh and Essendon Grammar School